The 2021–22 BBL season was the 45th season for the London Lions in the BBL, and 10th under the banner of London Lions.

The Lions play their home games at the 6,000 seat Copper Box Arena in Queen Elizabeth Olympic Park, London.

Roster

Depth chart

Pre-season 

|- style="background-color:#fcc;"
| 1
| 29 August
| @ AEK
| L 102–81
| not available
| not available
| not available
| Ano Liosia Olympic Hallclosed event
| 0–1
|- style="background-color:#cfc;"
| 2
| 31 August
| @ Α.Ο. Τρίτων
| W 47–69
| not available
| not available
| not available
| Ano Liosia Olympic Hallclosed event
| 1–1

|- style="background-color:#fcc;"
| 3
| 6 September
| @ Mega Basket
| L 82–58
| Dirk Williams (14)
| not available
| not available
| Mega Factory Hallclosed event
| 1–2
|- style="background-color:#cfc;"
| 4
| 8 September
| @ OKK Beograd
| W 78–97
| not available
| not available
| not available
| Mega Factory Hallclosed event
| 2–2
|- style="background-color:#fcc;"
| 5
| 9 September
| @ CSM Oradea
| L 102–90 (OT)
| not available
| not available
| not available
| Mega Factory Hallclosed event
| 2–3
|-

Basketball Champions League 

|- style="background-color:#fcc;"
| 1
| 13 September
| @ Universo Treviso Basket
| L 62–89
| Lorenzo Cugini (19)
| Chris Tawiah (10)
| Isaiah Reese (4)
| Palaverde903
| 0–1
|-

FIBA Europe Cup

Regular season

Group A 

|- style="background-color:#cfc;"
| 1
| 13 October
| @ Donar Groningen
| W 60–79
| Marquis Teague (22)
| Julian Washburn (11)
| Isaiah Reese (8)
| MartiniPlaza
| 1–0
|- style="background-color:#cfc;"
| 2
| 20 October
| Kapfenberg Bulls
| W 68–58
| Isaiah Reese (18)
| Julian Washburn (11)
| Isaiah Reese (6)
| Copper Box Arena
| 2–0
|- style="background-color:#cfc;"
| 3
| 27 October
| Medi Bayreuth
| W 91–81
| Reese, D.Williams (19)
| Kylor Kelley (7)
| Julian Washburn (11)
| Copper Box Arena
| 3–0

|- style="background-color:#cfc;"
| 4
| 3 November
| Donar Groningen
| W 85–67
| Marquis Teague (17)
| Kelley, J.Williams (8)
| Marquis Teague (6)
| Copper Box Arena
| 4–0
|- style="background-color:#cfc;"
| 5
| 10 November
| @ Kapfenberg Bulls
| W 81–100
| Marquis Teague (21)
| Julian Washburn (8)
| Isaiah Reese (8)
| Raiffeisen Sportpark
| 5–0
|- style="background-color:#fcc;"
| 6
| 17 November
| @ Medi Bayreuth
| L 97–78
| Dirk Williams (30)
| Reese, Washburn (6)
| Isaiah Reese (8)
| Oberfrankenhalle
| 5–1
|-

Second round

Group L 

|- style="background-color:#fcc;"
| 1
| 8 December
| @ Bahçeşehir Koleji
| L 107–82
| Marquis Teague (19)
| Kylor Kelley (8)
| Isaiah Reese (6)
| Ülker Sports Arena
| 0–1

|- style="background-color:#fcc;"
| 2
| 8 January
| @ Avtodor
| L 84–81
| Kylor Kelley (22)
| Kylor Kelley (13)
| Marquis Teague (12)
| Sports Palace Kristall
| 0–2
|- style="background-color:#fcc;"
| 3
| 12 January
| @ Bakken Bears
| L 95–80
| Majauskas, Reese (18)
| Julian Washburn (9)
| Isaiah Reese (8)
| Vejlby-Risskov Hallen
| 0–3
|- style="background-color:#fcc;"
| 4
| 26 January
| Bahçeşehir Koleji
| L 61–76
| Isaiah Reese (19)
| Kylor Kelley (11)
| Isaiah Reese (6)
| Copper Box Arena
| 0–4

|- style="background-color:#fcc;"
| 5
| 1 February
| Avtodor
| L 77–104
| Marquis Teague (28)
| Kylor Kelley (6)
| Isaiah Reese (9)
| Copper Box Arena
| 0–5
|- style="background-color:#cfc;"
| 6
| 9 February
| Bakken Bears
| W 82–75
| Dirk Williams (23)
| Isaiah Reese (10)
| Isaiah Reese (11)
| Copper Box Arena
| 1–5
|-

BBL Cup

South Group

Cup 

|- style="background-color:#cfc;"
| 1
| 24 September
| @ Surrey Scorchers
| W 85–86
| Jase Harrison (24)
| Harrison, Kaboza (7)
| Jase Harrison (10)
| Surrey Sports Park250
| 1–0
|- style="background-color:#cfc;"
| 2
| 26 September
| Plymouth City Patriots
| W 90–61
| Dirk Williams (19)
| Julian Washburn (11)
| Isaiah Reese (11)
| Copper Box Arena700
| 2–0

|- style="background-color:#cfc;"
| 3
| 2 October
| @ Bristol Flyers
| W 80–90
| Dirk Williams (21)
| Kelley, J.Williams (6)
| Isaiah Reese (10)
| SGS College Arenanot available
| 3–0
|- style="background-color:#cfc;"
| 4
| 8 October
| Surrey Scorchers
| W 88–73
| Dirk Williams (20)
| D.Williams, J.Williams (7)
| Isaiah Reese (14)
| Copper Box Arenanot available
| 4–0
|- style="background-color:#cfc;"
| 5
| 10 October
| Bristol Flyers
| W 94–85
| Dirk Williams (28)
| Julian Washburn (11)
| Isaiah Reese (11)
| Copper Box Arena400
| 5–0
|- style="background-color:#cfc;"
| 6
| 17 October
| @ Plymouth City Patriots
| W 62–101
| Lorenzo Cugini (35)
| Jordan Williams (9)
| Jordan Spencer (7)
| Plymouth Pavilionsnot available
| 6–0
|- style="background-color:#fcc;"
| 7
| 22 October
| @ Leicester Riders
| L 93–76
| Dirk Williams (30)
| Isaiah Reese (8)
| Reese, D.Williams (4)
| Morningside Arenanot available
| 6–1

|- style="background-color:#cfc;"
| 8
| 7 November
| @ Leicester Riders
| W 83–97
| Lorenzo Cugini (20)
| Jordan Williams (10)
| Isaiah Reese (8)
| Morningside Arena666
| 7–1
|- style="background-color:#cfc;"
| 9
| 13 November
| Sheffield Sharks
| W 100–68
| Lorenzo Cugini (28)
| Jordan Williams (12)
| Robinson, J.Williams (8)
| Copper Box Arena500
| 8–1

|- style="background-color:#fcc;"
| 10
| 10 December
| Leicester Riders
| L 96–99
| Dirk Williams (24)
| Kylor Kelley (13)
| Isaiah Reese (5)
| Copper Box Arenanot available
| 8–2
|- style="background-color:#fcc;"
| 11
| 30 December
| @ Leicester Riders
| L 79–74
| Isaiah Reese (20)
| Lorenzo Cugini (7)
| Isaiah Reese (7)
| Morningside Arena666
| 8–3
|-

BBL Championship

Standings

Championship 

|-style="background:#cfc;"
| 1
| 5 November
| Cheshire Phoenix
| W 113–74
| Dirk Williams (22)
| Jordan Williams (11)
| Jordan Williams (10)
| Copper Box Arena650
| 1–0
|-style="background:#cfc;"
| 2
| 20 November
| @ Surrey Scorchers
| W 72–85
| Isaiah Reese (24)
| Jordan Williams (10)
| Reese, J.Williams (6)
| Surrey Sports Park1,000
| 2–0

|-style="background:#fcc;"
| 3
| 3 December
| @ Newcastle Eagles
| L 96–84
| Isaiah Reese (23)
| Jordan Williams (10)
| Reese, J.Williams (8)
| Vertu Motors Arena2,500
| 2–1
|-style="background:#cfc;"
| 4
| 5 December
| Manchester Giants
| W 107–80
| Dirk Williams (30)
| Julian Washburn (7)
| Reese, Robinson, Washburn (5)
| Copper Box Arenanot available
| 3–1

|-style="background:#fcc;"
| 5
| 1 January
| @ Surrey Scorchers
| L 78–77
| Lorenzo Cugini (23)
| Kylor Kelley (8)
| Justin Robinson (7)
| Surrey Sports Park1,000
| 3–2
|-style="background:#cfc;"
| 6
| 23 January
| Newcastle Eagles
| W 103–94
| Isaiah Reese (25)
| Kelley, Washburn (7)
| Cugini, Robinson (5)
| Copper Box Arena800
| 4–2
|-style="background:#cfc;"
| 7
| 28 January
| @ Plymouth City Patriots
| W 94–101
| Reese, D.Williams (22)
| Kylor Kelley (12)
| Isaiah Reese (13)
| Plymouth Pavilionsnot available
| 5–2

|-style="background:#fcc;"
| 8
| 4 February
| Leicester Riders
| 67–80
| Dirk Williams (16)
| Julian Washburn (13)
| Isaiah Reese (6)
| Copper Box Arenanot available
| 5–3
|-style="background:#cfc;"
| 9
| 13 February
| Leicester Riders
| W 79–77
| Isaiah Reese (23)
| Joshua Ward-Hibbert (9)
| Isaiah Reese (3)
| Copper Box Arena2,000
| 6–3
|-style="background:#fcc;"
| 10
| 25 February
| Plymouth City Patriots
| L 81–83
| Dirk Williams (20)
| Dirk Williams (8)
| Isaiah Reese (12)
| Copper Box Arenanot available
| 6–4
|-style="background:#cfc;"
| 11
| 27 February
| @ Plymouth City Patriots
| W 73–77
| Cugini, D.Williams (17)
| Julian Washburn (9)
| Isaiah Reese (9)
| Plymouth Pavilions1,300
| 7–4

|-style="background:#cfc;"
| 12
| 4 March
| @ Glasgow Rocks
| W 75–96
| Reese, D.Williams (21)
| Ryan Martin (8)
| Isaiah Reese (11)
| Emirates Arena400
| 8–4
|-style="background:#fcc;"
| 13
| 6 March
| Sheffield Sharks
| L 76–83
| Dirk Williams (21)
| Kelly, Washburn (6)
| Justin Robinson (5)
| Copper Box Arenanot available
| 8–5
|-style="background:#cfc;"
| 14
| 13 March
| @ Cheshire Phoenix
| W 89–97
| Kylor Kelley (20)
| Kelly, D.Williams (7)
| Lorenzo Cugini (5)
| Cheshire Oaks Arena1,000
| 9–5
|-style="background:#fcc;"
| 15
| 17 March
| @ Manchester Giants
| L 94–56
| Dirk Williams (11)
| Kylor Kelley (11)
| Robinson, D.Williams (3)
| National Basketball Centre500
| 9–6
|-style="background:#fcc;"
| 16
| 25 March
| Glasgow Rocks
| L 92–100
| Isaiah Reese (20)
| Kylor Kelley (9)
| Reese, J.Williams (4)
| Copper Box Arena2,000
| 9–7
|-style="background:#cfc;"
| 17
| 26 March
| @ Bristol Flyers
| W 74–77
| Isaiah Reese (16)
| Cugini, Tawiah (8)
| Isaiah Reese (7)
| SGS College Arenanot available
| 10–7
|-style="background:#cfc;"
| 18
| 30 March
| Newcastle Eagles
| W 92–74
| Isaiah Reese (20)
| Kylor Kelley (17)
| Isaiah Reese (8)
| Copper Box Arena500
| 11–7

|-style="background:#cfc;"
| 19
| 1 April
| Bristol Flyers
| W 79–66
| Isaiah Reese (21)
| Kylor Kelley (12)
| Justin Robinson (5)
| Copper Box Arena1,000
| 12–7
|-style="background:#cfc;"
| 20
| 3 April
| Sheffield Sharks
| W 69–54
| Isaiah Reese (25)
| Kelley, Tawiah (8)
| Lorenzo Cugini (4)
| Copper Box Arenanot available
| 13–7
|-style="background:#fcc;"
| 21
| 6 April
| Bristol Flyers
| L 74–78
| Isaiah Reese (25)
| Kelley, Washburn (8)
| Isaiah Reese (8)
| Copper Box Arena1,500
| 13–8
|-style="background:#fcc;"
| 22
| 10 April
| @ Glasgow Rocks
| L 83–75
| Robinson, Washburn (17)
| Chris Tawiah (8)
| Isaiah Reese (7)
| Emirates Arena400
| 13–9
|-style="background:#fcc;"
| 23
| 15 April
| @ Sheffield Sharks
| L 78–71 (OT)
| Isaiah Reese (22)
| Kelley, Washburn (7)
| Reese, J.Williams (5)
| Ponds Forge800
| 13–10
|-style="background:#fcc;"
| 24
| 17 April
| @ Leicester Riders
| L 103–67
| Lorenzo Cugini (16)
| Chris Tawiah (11)
| Isaiah Reese (6)
| Morningside Arenanot available
| 13–11
|-style="background:#cfc;"
| 25
| 20 April
| Surrey Scorchers
| W 92–71
| Cugini, Reese (18)
| Julian Washburn (9)
| Lorenzo Cugini (4)
| Surrey Sports Parknot available
| 14–11
|-style="background:#cfc;"
| 26
| 22 April
| Cheshire Phoenix
| W 99–62
| Isaiah Reese (26)
| Kylor Kelley (9)
| Isaiah Reese (7)
| Copper Box Arena1,500
| 15–11
|-style="background:#cfc;"
| 27
| 24 April
| @ Manchester Giants
| W 80–90
| Isaiah Reese (32)
| Kelley, Washburn (9)
| Isaiah Reese (8)
| National Basketball Centrenot available
| 16–11
|-

BBL Trophy

Trophy 

|- style="background-color:#cfc;"
| 1
| 14 January 2022
| @ Newcastle Eagles
| W 70–84
| Dirk Williams (18)
| Kylor Kelley (10)
| Isaiah Reese (15)
| Vertu Motors Arena2,400
| 1–0

|- style="background-color:#cfc;"
| 2
| 6 February
| @ Manchester Giants
| W 79–90
| Dirk Williams (28)
| Kylor Kelley (8)
| Isaiah Reese (9)
| National Basketball Centre1,000
| 2–0
|- style="background-color:#cfc;"
| 3
| 19 February
| @ Bristol Flyers
| W 61–81
| Dirk Williams (19)
| Julian Washburn (15)
| Isaiah Reese (14)
| SGS College Arenanot available
| 3–0

|- style="background-color:#cfc;"
| 4
| 9 March
| Bristol Flyers
| W 85–81
| Dirk Williams (22)
| Tawiah, D.Williams (6)
| Justin Robinson (8)
| Copper Box Arena500
| 4–0
|- style="background-color:#fcc;"
| 5
| 20 March
| Cheshire Phoenix
| L 68–82
| Dirk Williams (24)
| Chris Tawiah (6)
| Kaboza, Robinson (5)
| Emirates Arena5,900
| 4–1
|-

BBL Playoffs

Playoffs 

|- style="background-color:#cfc;"
| 1
| 29 April
| Cheshire Phoenix
| W 85–69
| Julian Washburn (17)
| Julian Washburn (10)
| Julian Washburn (6)
| Copper Box Arenanot available
| 1–0
|- style="background-color:#fcc;"
| 2
| 1 May
| @ Cheshire Phoenix
| L 97–95
| Isaiah Reese (24)
| Ryan Martin (7)
| Isaiah Reese (7)
| Cheshire Oaks Arena800
| 1–1

|- style="background-color:#cfc;"
| 3
| 6 May
| @ Bristol Flyers
| W 83–85
| Isaiah Reese (24)
| Ryan Martin (7)
| Isaiah Reese (12)
| SGS College Arena770
| 2–1
|- style="background-color:#cfc;"
| 4
| 8 May
| Bristol Flyers
| W 91–73
| Isaiah Reese (28)
| Isaiah Reese (8)
| Isaiah Reese (8)
| Copper Box Arena1,800
| 3–1

|- style="background-color:#fcc;"
| 5
| 15 May
| @ Leicester Riders
| L 78–75
| Isaiah Reese (29)
| Chris Tawiah (14)
| Isaiah Reese (7)
| The O2 Arena15,824
| 3–2
|-

Transactions

Re-signed

Additions

Subtractions

See also 

 2021–22 British Basketball League season
 London Lions

References

External links 
London Lions (official website)
British Basketball League (official website)
Basketball Champions League (official website)
FIBA Europe Cup (official website)
FIBA (official website)

London Lions
London Lions season
London Lions season
London Lions season